Brownlee Dam is a hydroelectric earth fill embankment dam in the western United States, on the Snake River along the Idaho-Oregon border. In Hells Canyon at river mile 285, it impounds the Snake River in the  Brownlee Reservoir.

It is part of the Hells Canyon Project that also includes Hells Canyon Dam and Oxbow Dam, all built and operated by Idaho Power Company. The first and upper-most of the three dams, its contractor was Morrison-Knudsen of Boise.

The dam's powerhouse contains five generating units with a total nameplate capacity of 585.4 megawatts.

Lacking passage for migrating salmon, the three Hells Canyon Project dams blocked access by anadromous salmonids to a stretch of the Snake River drainage basin from Hells Canyon Dam up to Shoshone Falls, which naturally prevents any upstream fish passage to the upper Snake River basin.

Heliport
There is a  private heliport, Brownlee Heliport , located near the dam.

See also

Brownlee, Oregon, the dam's namesake, was located about two miles upstream.
List of dams in the Columbia River watershed

References

External links
 
 Brownlee Dam, Columbia Basin Research
 Brownlee Dam, Northwest Power and Conservation Council
 Brownlee Dam, Idaho Power

Dams in Idaho
Hydroelectric power plants in Idaho
Dams on the Snake River
Dams in Oregon
Buildings and structures in Baker County, Oregon
Buildings and structures in Washington County, Idaho
Earth-filled dams
Idaho Power dams
Dams completed in 1958
Energy infrastructure completed in 1958
1958 establishments in Oregon